Proto-Micronesian (abbreviated as PMc) is the reconstructed ancestor of the Micronesian languages. It belongs to the Oceanic branch of the Austronesian languages.

It was first reconstructed in detail by Byron W. Bender in 2003.

Descendants
Proto-Micronesian is the ancestor of almost all of the languages of Micronesia, except for Chamorro, Palauan, Yapese, and the two Polynesian languages of Nukuoro and Kapingamarangi, which are only distantly related to Proto-Micronesian.

With regards to subgrouping by Jackson (1986), it was thought that Nauruan fell outside the Nuclear Micronesian group. However, Hughes (2020) argues instead for the classification of Nauruan as a Nuclear Micronesian language, either as a primary branch of Micronesian, a subgrouping with Kosraean, or belonging within Central Micronesian.

Phonology
The consonants of Proto-Micronesian, according to Jackson, are:
 {| class="wikitable" style="text-align:center"
|+Consonants
! colspan="2" |
!Labiovelar
!Bilabial
!Dental
!Alveolar
!Palatal
!Velar
|-
! colspan="2" |Stop
|*
|*
|*
|
|*
|*
|-
! colspan="2" |Nasal
|*
|*
|*
|
|*
|*
|-
! colspan="2" |Fricative
|
|*
|*S
|*
|*Z
|*
|-
! colspan="2" |Affricate
|
|
|*T
|
|
|
|-
! colspan="2" |Approximant
|*
|
|
|*
|*
|
|}
The values of *S, *T, and *Z are unknown, the latter only occurring in two words: *kiaZo "outrigger boom" and *laZe "kind of coral".

The vowels of Proto-Micronesian, according to Jackson and Hughes, are:
 {| class="wikitable" style="text-align:center"
|+Vowels
! 
! Front
! Back
|-
!Close
| align=center | *
| align=center | *
|-
!Close-mid
| align=center | *
| align=center | *
|-
!Open
| colspan="2" style="text-align:center;"| *
|}

Example sentence
From Jackson (1986, 205), modified to fit Bender (2003)'s orthography:

Further reading
.

References

External links
 Micronesian Comparative Dictionary